Mountain Pine School District 46 (MPSD) is a public school district based in Mountain Pine, Arkansas, United States.  MPSD encompasses  of land in Garland County.

Its boundary includes Mountain Pine and a portion of Piney. A section of Hot Springs National Park is in the district. It also includes Royal.

It won the award for the 2020 1A-2A Eight-Man Football State Champions(6-1).

The school district serves more than 600 students with more than 100 faculty and staff at its two schools. The district and schools' mascot is the Red Devil with red and white serving as the colors.

Schools 
 Mountain Pine High School, serving more than 275 students in grades 7  through 12.
 Mountain Pine Elementary School, serving more than 325 students in prekindergarten through grade 6.

References

External links

 

Education in Garland County, Arkansas
School districts in Arkansas